The 2009 World Judo Championships was held in the Ahoy indoor sporting arena in Rotterdam, the Netherlands on 26 to 30 August.

Women's heavyweight champion Tong Wen was stripped of her gold medal because of a doping offence, but was later reinstated.

Categories 
Men's: 60 kg, 66 kg, 73 kg, 81 kg, 90 kg, 100 kg, +100 kg 
Women's: 48 kg, 52 kg, 57 kg, 63 kg, 70 kg, 78 kg, +78 kg

Schedule
Wednesday the 26th of August
Men -60 kg and -66 kg
Women -48 kg
Thursday the 27th of August
Men -73 kg
Women -52 kg and -57 kg
Friday the 28th of August
Men -81 kg
Women -63 kg
Saturday the 29th of August
Men -90 kg
Women -70 kg and -78 kg
Sunday the 30th of August
Men -100 kg and +100 kg
Women +78 kg

Medal overview

Men's events

Women's events

Medal table

See also
Judo at the 2008 Summer Olympics

References

External links
 
 Official website
 Video footage

World Judo Championships
World Championships
World Championships
Judo competitions in the Netherlands
Judo
Judo
Judo
Judo